Mısra Albayrak (born 10 October 2000) is a Turkish female basketball player. The  national plays Shooting guard.

Career

Galatasaray
She was trained in Galatasaray girls' basketball academy. He signed a contract with the A team in the 2018-19 season. On 28 July 2022, she announced that she said goodbye to the Galatasaray club with the post she made on her social media account.

References

External links
 Mısra Albayrak at Galatasaray.org
 Mısra Albayrak at Tbf.org

2000 births
Living people
Galatasaray S.K. (women's basketball) players
Turkish women's basketball players
Shooting guards